The 2016 Big Ten Women's Lacrosse Tournament was held May 5 to May 8 at Lanny and Sharon Martin Stadium in Evanston, Illinois. The winner of the tournament received the Big Ten Conference's automatic bid to the 2016 NCAA Division I Women's Lacrosse Championship. All six conference teams competed in the event. The tournament format is single elimination. The seeds were based upon the teams' regular season conference record. Maryland won their first conference tournament championship after winning the first two regular season crowns (2015, 2016) in conference history.

Standings

Schedule

Bracket
Lanny and Sharon Martin Stadium – Evanston, Illinois

* – Denotes overtime period

References
 https://web.archive.org/web/20160509074945/http://www.bigten.org/sports/w-lacros/spec-rel/043016aac.html

External links
 Big Ten Women's Lacrosse
 @B1GLacrosse

Big Ten Tournament
Big Ten Women's Lacrosse
Big Ten women's lacrosse tournament